The 1948 season was the 18th completed season of the Finnish Football League Championship known as the Mestaruussarja.

Overview
The Mestaruussarja was administered by the Finnish Football Association and the competition's 1948 season was divided into two groups: the Palloliiton league and the Työväen Urheiluliiton league, with the leading 6 teams from each group progressing to a final group along with the 4 leading teams from the Suomensarja. After the series had been played, VPS Vaasa and TPS Turku were tied with each having 24 points. These two teams then faced each other in a match that decided the championship. VPS won the match and the championship 3–0. The six lowest placed teams in the final group were relegated to the Suomensarja.

League standings

Results

Footnotes

References
Finland - List of final tables (RSSSF)

Mestaruussarja seasons
Fin
Fin
1